Kenzō Kōno (Kōno Kenzō, May 14, 1901 – October 16, 1983) was a Japanese politician who served as President of the House of Councillors (1971–1977) and President of the Japan Association of Athletics Federations (1965–1975).

Biography 
Kōno was born on May 14, 1901. Belonging to a political dynasty, he was the younger brother of his predecessor, Ichirō Kōno and the uncle of Yōhei Kōno (Ichiro's son); Tarō Kōno is his great-nephew. He graduated from the Waseda University. In his youth he was a long-distance runner and won stages of the Hakone Ekiden in 1921 and 1922.

In his political career, he was the president of the House of Councillors from 17 July 1971 to 3 July 1977, was elected five times as a member of the House of Councillors for Kanagawa Prefecture between 1953 and 1983, and was a Member of the House of Representatives for Kanagawa's third district from 24 January 1949 to 28 August 1952.

References
Chronicle of Japan Association of Athletics Federations
The Foreign Policy of Modern Japan By Robert A. Scalapino

|-

|-

|-

|-

|-

1901 births
1983 deaths
Recipients of the Order of the Rising Sun with Paulownia Flowers
People from Kanagawa Prefecture
Waseda University alumni
Japanese male long-distance runners
Japanese sports executives and administrators
Athletics (track and field) officials
Liberal Democratic Party (Japan) politicians
Presidents of the House of Councillors (Japan)